The Marfa Film Festival is a Film festival occurring annually in Marfa, Texas.

About

The Marfa Film Festival was founded in 2007 by creator Robin Lambaria and filmmaker Cory Van Dyke.

The program features works from promising newcomers and established filmmakers, as well as beloved or forgotten classics, including outdoor evening screenings in the arid landscape surrounding Marfa. The Festival does not designate winners, celebrating innovation and excellence in film through passionate curation and fostering a relaxed social space where up-and-coming filmmakers mix with adventurous cinephiles, industry veterans and living legends in a captivatingly scenic, culturally rich environment. Movies are shown one at a time to allow the possibility of viewing every film in the program without scheduling conflicts. Musical performances by popular acts, art installations, lounge spaces, and other special events are also a customary part of the 5-day event.

Festival alumni include Dennis Hopper, Larry McMurtry, Lou Reed, Omar Rodriguez–Lopez, and Heath Ledger.

History

The 2008 festival received accolades for an opening night screening on the "Little Boston" set of There Will Be Blood, which was filmed near Marfa. 400 attendees including crew members and extras who had never seen the film were shuttled to the set location 20 miles outside of Marfa. Other movies shown that year included Night of the Hunter, True Stories, The Innocents, Man On Wire, and two music videos directed by Heath Ledger. Edward Sharpe and the Magnetic Zeroes played their first-ever show at the 2008 festival, with an opening performance by artist Mia Doi Todd and Antony Langdon's band Victoria.  John Paul and Eloise Dejoria, owners of Patrón and Paul Mitchell, financed the first festival.

Renowned author Larry McMurtry  made a rare appearance to accept the first "Texas Screen Legend Award" presented by Marfa Film Festival in association with the Texas Association of Film Commissions at the 2009 Marfa Film Festival. Polly Platt and Dianna Ossana were also in attendance during an outdoor screening of The Last Picture Show.

Iconic musician Lou Reed attended to premiere his documentary Red Shirley at the 2010 festival. Omar Rodríguez-López's attended to show his feature film The Sentimental Engine Slayer. Other films screened include The Athlete or Atletu, directed by Davey Frankel and Rasselas Lakew, the 1972 classic The Harder They Come by Perry Henzell, and The Sun Ship Game, a 1971 documentary about competition soaring shot primarily in Marfa by Robert Drew, an American documentary filmmaker known as the father of cinema vérité, or direct cinema.

In 2011 the festival's co-founders parted ways, introducing a 2 year lull.

2014 festival highlights included a live score performance by CocoRosie to Sergei Peranajov's 1969 masterpiece The Color of Pomegranates, advance screenings of Richard Linklater's Boyhood and Michel Gondry's Mood Indigo, and an interactive experimental arcade designed especially for MFF around the “Space Cowboy” mythos.

2015

The 2015 Marfa Film Festival will occur October 14–18, 2015.

References

External links
 Official website
 Cinematical report of the event
 Coverage of the Marfa Film Festival at West Texas Weekly

Film festivals in Texas
Tourist attractions in Presidio County, Texas